Hamdi Abu Golayyel (Arabic: حمدي أبوجليل) is an Egyptian writer.

Early life
He was born in 1967/68 in a Bedouin village in the Fayoum region. His ancestors arrived from Libya in the early 19th century to settle in Fayoum. Abu Golayyel migrated to Cairo in the early 1980s, and worked as a construction labourer on building sites. These experiences later provided material for his literary endeavours.

Career
His first book was a collection of short stories published in 1997 under the title Swarm of Bees. His second collection, released in 2000, won several literary awards. He received further acclaim with his novel Thieves in Retirement, originally published by Merit Publishing House in Cairo, and later by Syracuse University Press in an English translation by Marilyn Booth. His next novel A Dog with No Tail won the Naguib Mahfouz Medal in 2008. An English translation by Robin Moger has been released by the AUC Press. He is regarded as one of the most important new voices in Egyptian fiction.

Abu Golayyel works in folklore research under the aegis of the Egyptian ministry of culture. He also contributes regularly to an Emirati newspaper. He is married with children and lives in Cairo.

References

Egyptian literary awards
Recipients of the Naguib Mahfouz Medal for Literature
Egyptian novelists
Egyptian male short story writers
Egyptian short story writers
Living people
People from Faiyum Governorate
Year of birth missing (living people)